Quercus annulata is a tree species in the beech family Fagaceae. There are no known subspecies. It is placed in subgenus Cerris, section Cyclobalanopsis.

This oak tree has oblong, caudate leaves, 100–120 mm with glaucous undersides.  It has been recorded from the Himalayas to Vietnam: the latter in the Phan Xi Păng area, where it may be called sồi vòng.

References

External links

annulata
Flora of Indo-China
Trees of Vietnam